Take Your Shoes Off is a blues album by Robert Cray, winning the Grammy Award for Best Contemporary Blues Album at the 42nd Annual Grammy Awards in 2000. It was released on April 27, 1999 through the Rykodisc label. The album won a Grammy Award not just for Cray, but also for drummer and composer Steve Jordan (who played on the album as well) as producer. Jordan, and his wife, Meegan Voss, also contributed to the album, with a composition they wrote together, entitled "It's All Gone".

Track listing 
 "Love Gone to Waste" (Tom Bingham, Willie Mitchell) – 4:39
 "That Wasn't Me" (Cray) – 4:45
 "All the Way" (Cray, Sue Turner-Cray) – 5:11
 "There's Nothing Wrong" (Cray) – 4:54
 "24-7 Man" (Mack Rice, Jon Tiven) – 3:22
 "Pardon" (Cray) – 5:49
 "Let Me Know" (Cray) – 4:25
 "It's All Gone" (Steve Jordan, Meegan Voss) – 5:21
 "Won't You Give Him (One More Chance)" (Joseph Martin, Winfield Scott) – 3:11
 "Living Proof" (Jim Pugh) – 5:31
 "What About Me" (Cray) – 6:47
 "Tollin' Bells" (Willie Dixon) – 5:57

Personnel
Robert Cray – vocals, guitar, bajo sexto 
Steve Jordan – guitar, bajo sexto, keyboards, bass, drums, snare drum, percussion, background vocals 
Jo-El Sonnier – accordion 
Jim Horn – tenor & baritone saxophones 
Bobby Keys, Jim Spake, Doug Moffet – tenor saxophone 
James Mitchell – baritone saxophone 
Scott Thompson – trumpet 
Jack Hale – trombone 
Jim Pugh – keyboards 
Karl Sevareid – bass 
Kevin Hayes – drums 
The Nashelles – background vocals
The Memphis Horns – Andrew Love – tenor saxophone; Wayne Jackson – trumpet

References

1999 albums
Robert Cray albums
Rykodisc albums
Grammy Award for Best Contemporary Blues Album